National Highway 219, commonly referred to as NH 219 is a national highway in  India. It is a spur road of National Highway 19. NH-219 traverses the states of Bihar and Uttar Pradesh in India.

Route 
Mohania, Bhabhua, Chainpur, Chand, Chandauli.

Junctions  

  Terminal near Mohania.
  Terminal near Chandauli.

See also 

 List of National Highways in India by highway number
 List of National Highways in India by state

References

External links 
 NH 219 on OpenStreetMap

National highways in India
National Highways in Bihar
National Highways in Uttar Pradesh